Rhythm and Blues Revue is a 1955 American concert film directed by Joseph Kohn and Leonard Reed.

Summary 
Rhythm and Blues Revue is a plotless variety show, one of several compiled for theatrical exhibition from the made-for-television short films produced by Snader and Studio Telescriptions, with newly filmed host segments by Willie Bryant. Originally 86 minutes, the "short" version available on public domain collections and websites is missing a reel.

Producer Ben Frye also released the film Harlem Rock 'n' Roll the year prior.

Cast 
Lionel Hampton
Faye Adams
Bill Bailey
Herb Jeffries
Freddie & Flo (Freddie Lucas and Florence Hill)
Amos Milburn
The Larks (David Bowers, Orville Brooks and Gene Mumford)
Sarah Vaughan
Count Basie
Big Joe Turner
Delta Rhythm Boys
Martha Davis
Little Buck
Nat King Cole
Mantan Moreland
Nipsey Russell
Cab Calloway
Ruth Brown
Willie Bryant

Soundtrack 
Amos Milburn - "Bad Bad Whiskey"
Bill Bailey (dancing) - "The World Is Waiting For The Sunrise"
The Larks - "The World Is Waiting For The Sunrise"
Nat King Cole - "Calypso Blues"
Delta Rhythm Boys - "Dry Bones"
Faye Adams - "Every Day"
Martha Davis & Her Spouse - "Goodbye Honey, Goodbye"
Count Basie Combo - "Basie's Conversation", "One O'Clock Jump
Ruth Brown - "It's Raining Teardrops From My Eyes"
Lionel Hampton And His Orchestra - "Vibe Boogie", "Bongo Interlude"
Cab Calloway And His Orchestra - "Minnie the Moocher"
Sarah Vaughan - "Perdido"
Big Joe Turner - "Shake, Rattle and Roll"
Herb Jeffries - "In My Heart (There's a Song)"

See also 
Rock 'n' Roll Revue

Notes

External links 

1955 films
American documentary films
Concert films
1950s English-language films
1950s American films
1955 documentary films
American black-and-white films